Nova Friburgo (commonly referred to as just "Friburgo") is a municipality in the state of Rio de Janeiro in southeastern Brazil. It is located in the mountainous region, in the Center Mesoregion of the state,  from its capital Rio de Janeiro. Its population was 191,158 (2020) and its area is 933 km2.

The main economic activities are the undergarment industry, olericulture, goat raising, various industries (textile, clothing, metallurgy) and tourism. It is also the coldest city of the state.

History 

Up to the 19th century, the region of the present Nova Friburgo was inhabited by Coroado Purí Indians. In 1818, King John VI was interested in improving the relationship with Germany, in order to obtain support against the French empire. He then proposed a planned settlement that would promote the civilization in Brazil. A royal decree of May 1818, authorized the Canton of Fribourg of Switzerland, to establish a colony of 100 Swiss families in the Morro Queimado Farm, in Cantagalo District, a place with climate and natural characteristics similar to those in their country. 

Between 1819 and 1820, the region was settled by 265 Swiss families, in total 1,458 immigrants. It was named Nova Friburgo (New Fribourg) by the Swiss after the homeland of most of the families.

Following the Independence of Brazil in 1822, the Imperial Government continued the policy of populating the nation by attracting European colonization. Eighty German families previously assigned to settlements in the Province of Bahia, for unknown reasons ended up in Nova Friburgo, where they arrived on the 3 and 4 May 1824. Similar arrivals of Italians, Portuguese and a minority of Syrians led to such population increases that the once village was elevated to city status on 8 January 1890.

In 1872, the Baron of Nova Friburgo brought to the region the Leopoldina Railroad, to allow for the flow of the coffee from Cantagalo. Agriculture was the basis of economic activity until 1910, when the arrival of industrialists pioneered the development of an industrial sector still thriving to the present day. Of similar importance was the relative proximity to Niterói and Rio de Janeiro and the improvement of transport and communication links such as paved roads and telegraph. This encouraged a small tourist industry to grow, which, together with local commerce, became the main source of income for the city.

Nova Friburgo was affected by the 2011 Brazilian floods on 11 January with mudslides causing at least 820 deaths and more than 200 people to go missing in the biggest natural disaster in the history of Brazil. The population was left with no water, electricity, food or gas.

Geography

Climate 

Nova Friburgo has a subtropical highland climate (Köppen climate classification Cwb), with fresh and dry winters and humid and mild summers.

Economy 
The city has a strong drive towards tourism due to the landscape, rivers, trails and bucolic spots. It has the second largest network of hotels of the state, after the capital Rio de Janeiro. The urban district is visited for its cold climate, the tranquility and romanticism. However, there are also attractions more distant to the center, which are appreciated by those who are interested in ecotourism and adventure sports like rafting and canoeing. The district of Lumiar is one of the most important sites for these sports in the state.

Nova Friburgo is known as the national capital of the undergarment industry, due to the vast production and variety of models, and the local brands begin to compete in the international market. Other major industries include textile mills and metallurgic industries.

Agriculture is important in the area of olericulture and goat raising, as well as in the production of flowers, of which the municipality is the second largest producer in the country, surmounted only by Holambra, in the state of São Paulo.

The municipality contains part of the Central Rio de Janeiro Atlantic Forest Mosaic of conservation units, created in 2006.
It contains  of the  Macaé de Cima Environmental Protection Area, created in 2001.

Tourism 

The main attractions of the city are:

 Alpine-style architecture of the buildings of MuryShopping, the Bucsky and Garlipp hotels and the restaurant Bräun & Bräun
 "Casa Suiça" (the Swiss House)
 Cheese-making school FRIALP
 District of Lumiar
 District of São Pedro da Serra
 Encontro dos Rios (merging of rivers Macaé and Bonito)
 Gastronomic center, in the district of Mury
 Getulio Vargas Square
 Marcilio Dias Square, which marks the beginning of the settlement, for it is the area where the first Germans camped, coming from Europe
 Nova Friburgo Country Club
 Park of Furnas do Catete, with the Cão Sentado (Sitting Dog) Stone
 Pedra Riscada (scratched stone)
 Saint John Baptist Cathedral
 Suspiro Square, with the biggest chairlift of the country
 The municipality contains 19% of the  Três Picos State Park, created in 2002.

Demographics
 Population: 202,085
 Urban: 178,377
 Rural: 23,708
 Male: 97,253
 Female: 104,832

Racial composition
 White: 78.3%
 Pardo (multiracial): 13.9%
 Black: 7.0%
 Asian: 0.1%
 Indigenous: 0.1%
 0.5% not reported

(Source: IBGE)

Ethnic groups
Portuguese, Swiss, German, Italian, Austrian, Spanish, Lebanese, African, Hungarian, Japanese.

Gallery

Notable people 
 Benito di Paula, singer-songwriter and pianist

Sister cities
  Fribourg, Switzerland

External links

References 

German-Brazilian culture
Municipalities in Rio de Janeiro (state)
Swiss German language
Swiss Brazilian